Eudonia lycopodiae is a moth of the family Crambidae described by Otto Herman Swezey in 1910. It is endemic to the Hawaiian island of Oahu.

The larvae feed on Lycopodiella cernua. They bore the stem of their host plant. It enters the stem when quite small and bores downward in the middle of the stem. Having become full grown, it eats a round hole nearly through to the exterior, then pupates just below, where it can readily emerge through the hole at the final transformation. The full-grown larva is about 15 mm and pale shiny green.

The pupa is about 7.5 mm and pale yellowish.

External links

Eudonia
Endemic moths of Hawaii
Moths described in 1910